Monobenzyl phthalate (MBzP) also known as benzene-1, 2-dicarboxylic acid is an organic compound with the condensed structural formula C6H5CH2OOCC6H4COOH. It is the major metabolite of butyl benzyl phthalate(BBP), a common plasticizer.BBP can also be metabolized into monobutyl phthalate (MBP). Like many phthalates, BBP has attracted attention as a potential endocrine disruptor.

References 

Phthalate esters
Endocrine disruptors